The 2000–01 NBA season was the 34th season for the Seattle SuperSonics in the National Basketball Association. With the hopes of improving the team in the middle, the Sonics acquired All-Star center Patrick Ewing from the New York Knicks, and signed free agent Pervis Ellison. However, the Sonics would get off to a slow start losing seven of their first ten games. Head coach Paul Westphal was fired after a 6–9 start, and was replaced with former Sonics guard Nate McMillan. The Sonics played above .500 for the remainder of the season holding a 28–24 record at the All-Star break, and finishing fifth in the Pacific Division with a 44–38 record, but missed the playoffs by finishing tenth place in the Western Conference.

Gary Payton averaged 23.1 points, 8.1 assists and 1.6 steals per game, and was named to the All-NBA Third Team, and the NBA All-Defensive First Team, while Rashard Lewis showed improvement stepping into the lineup averaging 14.8 points and 6.9 rebounds per game. Ruben Patterson averaged 13.0 points per game, while Vin Baker provided the team with 12.2 points and 5.7 rebounds per game, Ewing provided with 9.6 points, 7.4 rebounds and 1.2 blocks per game, Brent Barry contributed 8.8 points per game and .476 three-point percentage, and top draft pick Desmond Mason was selected to the NBA All-Rookie Second Team.

During the All-Star Weekend in Washington, D.C., Payton was selected for the All-Star Game, and Mason won the Slam Dunk Contest. It was Ewing's only season in a Sonics uniform, as he signed as a free agent with the Orlando Magic the following season. Also following the season, Patterson signed with the Portland Trail Blazers, and Ellison retired.

Draft picks

Roster

Roster Notes
 Point guard Shammond Williams holds American and Georgian dual citizenship. He was born in the United States, but he played on the Georgian national team.

Regular season

Standings

Record vs. opponents

Game log

Player statistics

* Statistics include only games with the SuperSonics

Awards and records

Awards
 Gary Payton, All-NBA Third Team
 Gary Payton, NBA All-Defensive First Team
 Desmond Mason, NBA All-Rookie Team 2nd Team

Records

Transactions

Trades

Free agents

Additions

Subtractions

See also
 2000–01 NBA season

References

Seattle SuperSonics seasons